Orlando Bridgeman was one of the two MPs for Ipswich in the English parliament from April 1714 to January 1715.  He stood as a Tory.

References

Bridgeman